Islam salem (EGY boxer)

Ahmed Ismail El Shamy(born October 21, 1975) is an Egyptian boxer who competed in the Men's Light Heavyweight (– 81 kg) at the 2004 Summer Olympics and won the bronze medal. One year earlier, he captured the gold medal in his weight division at the All-Africa Games in Abuja, Nigeria

References

1975 births
Living people
Sportspeople from Cairo
Light-heavyweight boxers
Olympic boxers of Egypt
Boxers at the 2004 Summer Olympics
Olympic medalists in boxing
Medalists at the 2004 Summer Olympics
Egyptian male boxers
Olympic bronze medalists for Egypt
Mediterranean Games bronze medalists for Egypt
Competitors at the 2001 Mediterranean Games
African Games gold medalists for Egypt
African Games medalists in boxing
Mediterranean Games medalists in boxing
Competitors at the 2003 All-Africa Games